The Sol Plaatje Local Municipality is a local municipality in the Frances Baard District Municipality district of the Northern Cape province, South Africa, named after Sol T. Plaatje. It includes the diamond mining city of Kimberley.

Main places
The 2011 census divided the municipality into the following main places:

Politics 

The municipal council consists of sixty-five members elected by mixed-member proportional representation. Thirty-three councillors are elected by first-past-the-post voting in thirty-three wards, while the remaining thirty-two are chosen from party lists so that the total number of party representatives is proportional to the number of votes received. In the election of 1 November 2021 the African National Congress (ANC) won a majority of thirty-three seats on the council.

The following table shows the results of the election.

Mayors
 Maria Chwarisang
 Patrick Lenyibi
 Patrick Everyday
 Agnes Ntlhangula 
 David Molusi 
 Mangaliso Matika
 Pule Thabane
 Patrick Mabilo
 Kagisho Dante Sonyoni

References

External links
 Official website

 
Local municipalities of the Frances Baard District Municipality